Rolando Joselito Delizo Bautista is a retired Filipino lieutenant general who served as the Secretary of Social Welfare and Development under the Duterte administration from 2018 to 2022. He held various positions in the military, such as the former Commanding General of the Philippine Army, commander of the Joint Task Force Marawi during the Battle of Marawi, and the Presidential Security Group.

Military background
 
A graduate in the Philippine Military Academy, he is a member of the PMA “Sandiwa” class of 1985 and took various preparatory and specialization courses in intelligence and counter-terrorist operations. Bautista completed various intelligence, counter-terrorism, infantry, and other related courses in the country and abroad, such as the AFP Command and General Staff Course at the Armed Forces of the Philippines Command and General Staff College and the VIP Protective Detail Course at the US Embassy in Manila. He is also a Scout Ranger-trained General, and is a qualified member of the Special Forces. During his junior years, then-Lieutenant Bautista, along with then-Lieutenant Carlito Galvez Jr. and other AFP troops were part of the Reform the Armed Forces Movement (RAM), under the leadership then-Colonel Gregorio Honasan, and participated in the 1989 failed coup attempt against President Corazon Aquino. Bautista and his conspirators were arrested before being granted amnesty by President Fidel Ramos in 1996.

Lieutenant General Bautista is a well-known Mindanao Veteran, described as "well-rounded", "silent worker", an "achiever", and a "workaholic". He also served at the United Nations Transitional Administration in East Timor. He led the 73rd Infantry Battalion of the 10th Infantry Division in 2005–2007, and the Unified Command Staff Chief of the AFP Northern Luzon Command, from February 2012 to October 2013, the Task Force General Santos and the Joint Task Group Basilan. In 2014, he served as the commander of the Joint Task Group Basilan and the 104th Infantry Brigade of the 1st Infantry Division, replacing then-Brigadier General Carlito Galvez Jr. During the Duterte Administration, he quickly rose through the ranks, as he led the Presidential Security Group in 2016. After finishing his 10 month stint, he was then transferred to the 1st Infantry Division in Mindanao, and was promoted to Major General for his counter-terrorism expertise.

Then-Major General Bautista served as the overall ground commander of the Joint Task Force Marawi during the Battle of Marawi, where he, along with then-Lieutenant General Carlito Galvez Jr. and other AFP generals spearheaded the overall military operations against the Maute group and the Abu Sayyaf. He also implemented innovative tactics and strategies against the terrorists, such as placing wood and steel planks on the AFP's armored vehicles to counter against enemy RPGs. On October 5, 2017, as the final phase of operations in Marawi materialized, he was appointed by President Rodrigo Duterte as the Commanding General of the Philippine Army, replacing then-Army Chief Lieutenant General Glorioso Miranda, and was promoted to Lieutenant General. As the Chief of the Philippine Army, he led the formulations of new doctrines and changes in the army's modernization program against terrorism, communist insurgencies, and external defense, as part of the lessons learned from urban warfare. He retired from military service on October 15, 2018, as he was replaced by then-Commander of the Intelligence Service of the AFP (ISAFP) Major General Macairog S. Alberto.

Awards in military service
  Philippine Republic Presidential Unit Citation
  Martial Law Unit Citation
  People Power I Unit Citation
  People Power II Unit Citation
  2 Grand Commander medals, Philippine Legion of Honor
  Outstanding Achievement Medals
  Distinguished Service Stars
  Gawad sa Kaunlaran medals
   Bronze Cross Medal
   Military Merit Medals with one spearhead device, 3 silver and 1 bronze anahaws
  Military Civic Action Medal 
   Military Commendation Medals
  United Nations Service Medal
  United Nations Transitional Administration in East Timor (UNTAET) Ribbon
  Long Service Medal
  Anti-dissidence Campaign Medal 
  Luzon Anti-Dissidence Campaign Medal
  Visayas Anti-Dissidence Campaign Medal
  Mindanao Anti-Dissidence Campaign Medal
  Disaster Relief and Rehabilitation Operations Ribbon
  Combat Commander's Badge
  Scout Ranger Qualification Badge
  Special Forces Qualification Badge
  AFP Parachutist Badge
  Presidential Security Group Badge
  AFP Command and General Staff Course Badge
  United States Army Infantry School Badge

Controversy with Erwin Tulfo
His stint as Secretary of Social Welfare and Development came with a controversy involving him and journalist/broadcaster Erwin Tulfo, after the journalist, threatened him and gave tirades on-air on his radio show “Tutok Tulfo” on Radyo Pilipinas. Sec. Bautista was not available while having a meeting with an ambassador at the moment Tulfo's team was reaching him for a live, on-air interview regarding about the DSWD's plans on a recent signing of anti-poverty measure Magna Carta of the Poor.

References

|-

1961 births
Living people
Philippine Military Academy alumni
Philippine Army generals
Recipients of the Philippine Legion of Honor
Recipients of the Philippine Republic Presidential Unit Citation
Recipients of the Distinguished Service Star
Recipients of the Gold Cross (Philippines)
Recipients of the Bronze Cross Medal
Recipients of the Military Merit Medal (Philippines)
Recipients of the Military Civic Action Medal
Recipients of the Military Commendation Medal
Recipients of Gawad sa Kaunlaran
Secretaries of Social Welfare and Development of the Philippines
Duterte administration cabinet members
People from La Union